Raúl Labbate (born 8 March 1952) is an Argentine former cyclist. He competed in the individual road race and team time trial events at the 1976 Summer Olympics.

References

External links
 

1952 births
Living people
Argentine male cyclists
Olympic cyclists of Argentina
Cyclists at the 1976 Summer Olympics
People from Pergamino
Sportspeople from Buenos Aires Province